Narechen Glacier is the 9 km long and 11 km wide glacier draining the western slopes of the Lassus Mountains on the northwest coast of Alexander Island in Antarctica. Flowing westwards to enter Lazarev Bay in the Wilkins Sound, Bellingshausen Sea. The glacier is situated south of the southwestern ridge of Mount Wilbye and north of Faulkner Nunatak.

The glacier is named after the settlement and spa resort of Narechen in southern Bulgaria.

Location
British mapping in 1963.

See also
 Lennon Glacier
 Palestrina Glacier
 Wubbold Glacier

Maps
 British Antarctic Territory. Scale 1:200000 topographic map No. 3127. DOS 610 - W 69 70. Tolworth, UK, 1971.
 Antarctic Digital Database (ADD). Scale 1:250000 topographic map of Antarctica. Scientific Committee on Antarctic Research (SCAR), 1993–2016.

References
 Narechen Glacier. SCAR Composite Gazetteer of Antarctica.
 Bulgarian Antarctic Gazetteer. Antarctic Place-names Commission. (details in Bulgarian, basic data in English)

External links
 Narechen Glacier. Copernix satellite image

Glaciers of Alexander Island
Bulgaria and the Antarctic